= Arya Vedic School =

Coordinates: 1.275718°S 36.825581°E

Arya Vedic Academy
- Nairobi; Kenya

Information
- Type: Private school
- Established: 1980
- Website: aryavedicschool-nrb.sc.ke

The Arya Vedic Academy is a private school in Ngara, a suburb of Nairobi, Kenya. It was founded by the Arya Samaj in 1980. As part of its participation in the International Advanced Level and International General Certificate for Secondary Education, the Academy participates in the annual Pearson Edexcel final examinations which are held between May - June every year in which the senior-most class takes part. As of 2012, the Academy also offers iPrimary Examinations from Pearson Edexcel at the primary level also take part in a similar examination.

== School organisation ==
Arya Vedic consists of a nursery, primary and secondary sections. The Nursery section follows early years curriculum from Pearson Edexcel while the primary section consists of classes 1 through to 6 (class 6 being the class that participates in the Pearson Edexcel iPrimary examinations), while the secondary section consists of classes 7 through to 13 (Year 11, 12 and 13 being the class that participates in the secondary examinations). It follows the International Advanced Level and International General Certificate of Secondary Education curriculum in the secondary sections.

== School location ==
The school is located within an urban setting in the city of Nairobi.
